Jennifer Parlevliet (born 27 April 1960 in Croydon, New South Wales), is an Australian equestrian.

She competed at the Atlanta 1996 Olympics in the individual and the team jumping events. Riding Another Flood, Parlevliet failed to qualify for the final round. The Australian team, comprising Vicki Roycroft, David Cooper, Russell Johnstone and Parlevliet, finished 18th in the team jumping event.

References 

1960 births
Australian female equestrians
Australian event riders
Equestrians at the 1996 Summer Olympics
Olympic equestrians of Australia
Living people